Lakewood High School is a public secondary school located in the southern California city of Lakewood.  Founded in 1957, it is part of the Long Beach Unified School District. Lakewood is the architectural twin of nearby Millikan High School, which opened in 1956.

Demographics
The demographic breakdown of the 3,693 students enrolled in 2013-2014 was:
Male - 52.0%
Female - 48.0%
Native American/Alaskan - 0.2%
Asian/Pacific islanders - 13.7%
Black - 16.9%
Hispanic - 45.4%
White - 21.4%
Multiracial - 2.4%

49.3% of the students were eligible for free or reduced lunch.

Athletics

State championships
 Baseball: 1962, 1970, 1976, 1987, 2006 
Girls' Volleyball: 2007

Notable alumni

Dion Bailey, football player
Steve Bollenbach, CEO of Hilton Hotels
Mike Carp, infielder
Larry Casian, pitcher
J.R. Celski, Olympic speedskater 
Floyd Chiffer, pitcher
Duane Cooper, NBA point guard
J. P. Crawford, baseball player
Travis d'Arnaud, catcher
Shane Dawson, celebrity YouTuber 
Matt Duffy, infielder
Damion Easley, infielder
John Elefante, singer, songwriter
Bruce Ellingsen, pitcher
Pat Farrah, co-founder of The Home Depot
Mike Fitzgerald, catcher
John Flannery, infielder
Rod Gaspar, outfielder
Steve Genter, 1972 Summer Olympics gold medalist (swimming)
Bob Goen, game show host
Chris Gomez, infielder
Craig Grebeck, infielder
Hunter Jones, minor league outfielder
Dave Marshall, outfielder
Jeremy McNichols, football running back for Tampa Bay Buccaneers
Tod Murphy, NBA power forward/center
Tony Muser, baseball manager, infielder
Mike Rae, football quarterback
Barbara Allen Rainey, first American female naval aviator

References

External links
 Lakewood High School official website

Educational institutions established in 1957
High schools in Los Angeles County, California
Public high schools in California
Lakewood, California
1957 establishments in California